Russia, the largest country in the world by area, had a population of 147.2 million according to the 2021 census, or 144.7 million when excluding Crimea and Sevastopol, up from 142.8 million in the 2010 census. It is the most populous country in Europe, and the ninth-most populous country in the world, with a population density of 8.5 inhabitants per square kilometre (22 per square mile). As of 2020, the overall life expectancy in Russia at birth was 71.54 years (66.49 years for males and 76.43 years for females).

From 1992 to 2012, and again since 2016, Russia's death rate has exceeded its birth rate, which has been called a demographic crisis by analysts. Subsequently, the nation has an ageing population, with the median age of the country being 40.3 years. In 2009, Russia recorded annual population growth for the first time in fifteen years; during the mid-2010s, Russia had seen increased population growth due to declining death rates, increased birth rates and increased immigration. However, since 2020, due to excess deaths from the COVID-19 pandemic, Russia's population has undergone its largest peacetime decline in recorded history. In 2020, the total fertility rate across Russia was estimated to be 1.5 children born per woman, which is below the replacement rate of 2.1 and about equal to the European average.

Russia is a multinational state, home to over 193 ethnic groups nationwide. In the 2021 Census, roughly 71.7% of the population were ethnic Russians, 16.7% of the population were ethnic minorities and 11.6% did not state an ethnicity. According to the United Nations, Russia's immigrant population is the world's third largest, numbering over 11.6 million; most of whom are from other post-Soviet states.

Population 
Demographic statistics according to the latest Rosstat vital statistics and the World Population Review in 2019.
 One birth every 22 seconds
 One death every 13 seconds
 Net loss of one person every 30 seconds
 One net migrant every 4 minutes

Note: Crude migration change (per 1000) is a trend analysis, an extrapolation

Fertility 
Between 1993 and 2008, there was a great decrease in the country's population from 148 to 143 million. There was a huge 50% decrease in the number of births per year from 2.5 million in 1987 to 1.2 million since 1997, but the current 1.58 fertilty rate is still better than those of the 1990s.

At the beginning of 2022, 320,400 babies were born between January-March, 16,600 fewer than January-March 2021. There were twice as many deaths as there were births, deaths were 584,700 people. The birth rate was 8.9 new babies per 100,000 inhabitants, the lowest crude birth rate since the year 2000.

Russia has one of the lowest fertility rates in the world with 1.58 children per woman in 2021, below 2.1 children per woman, which must be the number reached in order to maintain its population. As a result of their low fertility for decades, the Russian population is one of the oldest in the world with an average of 40.3 years.

Historical fertility rates 

The total fertility rate is the number of children born to each woman. It is based on fairly good data for the entire period. Sources: Our World In Data and Gapminder Foundation.

In many of the following years, Russia had the highest total fertility rate in the world. These elevated fertility rates did not lead to population growth due to the casualties of the Russian Revolution, the two world wars and political killings.

Historical crude birth rates

Age structure

Median age 

total: 40.7 years. Country comparison to the world: 51st
male: 37.6 years
female: 43.5 years (2021 est.)

Life expectancy 

total population: 71.54 years for a child born in 2020, decreasing from 73.34 in 2019
male: 66.49 years (2020)
female: 76.49 years (2020)

Infant mortality rate

total: 4.5 deaths/1,000 live births (2020)
male: 5.0 deaths/1,000 live births (2020)
female: 3.9 deaths/1,000 live births (2020)

Vital statistics

Before WW2

After WW2

Current vital statistics

2022

2023

All numbers for the Russian Federation in this section do not include the Ukrainian regions of Kherson, Zaporizhzhia, Donetsk and Luhansk, which Russia annexed in September 2022 and which are currently partly under Russian military control. The annexation is internationally recognized only by North Korea.

Immigration 

In 2006, in a bid to compensate for the country's demographic decline, the Russian government started simplifying immigration laws. New citizenship rules introduced in April 2014 allowing eligible citizens from former Soviet republics to obtain Russian citizenship, have gained strong interest among Russian-speaking residents of those countries (i.e. Russians, Germans, Belarusians and Ukrainians).

There are an estimated four million undocumented immigrants from the ex-Soviet states in Russia. In 2012, the Russian Federal Security Service's Border Service stated there had been an increase in undocumented migration from the Middle East and Southeast Asia (Note that these were Temporary Contract Migrants) Under legal changes made in 2012, undocumented immigrants who are caught will be banned from reentering the country for 10 years.

Since the collapse of the USSR, most immigrants have come from Ukraine, Uzbekistan, Tajikistan, Azerbaijan, Armenia, Kyrgyzstan, Moldova, Kazakhstan, Turkmenistan, Belarus, from poor areas of China, and from Vietnam and Laos.

Worker migration
Temporary migrant workers in Russia consists of about 7 million people, most of the temporary workers come from Central Asia (mostly from Uzbekistan, Tajikistan and Kyrgyzstan), South Caucasus (mostly from Armenia and Azerbaijan), East Asia (mostly from poor areas of China, from Vietnam and Laos). Most of them work in the construction, cleaning and in the household industries. They primarily live in cities such as Moscow, Sochi and Blagoveshchensk. The mayor of Moscow said that Moscow cannot do without worker migrants. New laws are in place that require worker migrants to be fluent in Russian, know Russian history and laws. The Russian Opposition and most of the Russian population opposes worker migration. The hate of worker migration has become so severe it has caused a rise in Russian nationalism, and spawned groups like Movement Against Illegal Immigration.

Emigration

The fourth wave of Russian emigration took place after the collapse of the Soviet Union in 1991 when people began migrating from Russia in large numbers.

The 2022 Russian invasion of Ukraine has led to considerable emigration, with over 300,000 Russian citizens and residents are estimated to have left Russia by mid-March 2022, at least 500,000 by the end of August 2022, and an additional 400,000 by early October. The total number of political refugees, economic migrants, and conscientious objectors is thought to be more than 900,000. In addition to evading criminal prosecution for opposing the invasion, and fear of being conscripted after President Vladimir Putin's 21 September 2022 announcement of partial mobilization, those fleeing voiced reasons such as disagreement with the war, the uselessness and cruelty of the war, sympathy for Ukraine, disagreement with the political roots of the war with Ukraine, the rejection of killing, and an assessment that Russia is no longer the place for their family.

Occupied and annexed regions 

Russia has encouraged or even forced people in occupied or annexed regions to become Russian citizens, a procedure known as passportization. This includes the Donetsk, Kherson, Luhansk and Zaporizhzhia oblasts of Ukraine, and South Ossetia and Abkhazia in Georgia.

Employment and income 

Unemployment, youth ages 15–24

total: 16%. Country comparison to the world: 83rd
male: 15.3%
female: 16.9% (2015 est.)

Health

Russia's constitution guarantees free, universal health care for all Russian citizens, through a compulsory state health insurance program. The Ministry of Health of the Russian Federation oversees the Russian public healthcare system, and the sector employs more than two million people. Federal regions also have their own departments of health that oversee local administration. A separate private health insurance plan is needed to access private healthcare in Russia.
 
Russia spent 5.32% of its GDP on healthcare in 2018. Its healthcare expenditure is notably lower than other developed nations. Russia has one of the world's most female-biased sex ratios, with 0.859 males to every female, due to its high male mortality rate. In 2019, the overall life expectancy in Russia at birth was 73.2 years (68.2 years for males and 78.0 years for females), and it had a very low infant mortality rate (5 per 1,000 live births).

The principal cause of death in Russia are cardiovascular diseases. Obesity is a prevalent health issue in Russia; 61.1% of Russian adults were overweight or obese in 2016. However, Russia's historically high alcohol consumption rate is the biggest health issue in the country, as it remains one of the world's highest, despite a stark decrease in the last decade. Smoking is another health issue in the country. The country's high suicide rate, although on the decline, remains a significant social issue.

COVID-19 pandemic

Russia had one of the highest number of confirmed cases in the world. Analysis of excess deaths from official government demographic statistics, based on births and deaths and excluding migration, showed that Russia had its biggest ever annual population drop in peacetime, with the population declining by 997,000 between October 2020 and September 2021, which demographer Alexei Raksha interpreted as being primarily due to the COVID-19 pandemic.

Ethnic groups

Russia is a multinational state, with many subnational entities associated with different minorities. There are over 193 ethnic groups nationwide. In the 2021 census, roughly 71.7% of the population were ethnic Russians, and the remaining 16.7% of the population were ethnic minorities with 11.6% not stating an ethnicity. In 2010, four-fifths of Russia's population originated from West of the Ural Mountains — of which the vast majority were Slavs, with a substantial minority of Finnic and Germanic peoples. Turkic peoples form a large minority, and are spread around pockets across the vast nation. Various distinct ethnic groups also inhabit the North Caucasus. Other minorities include Mongolian peoples (Buryats and Kalmyks), the Indigenous peoples of Siberia, a historical Jewish population, and the Koryo-saram (including Sakhalin Koreans).

According to the United Nations, Russia's immigrant population is the third-largest in the world, numbering over 11.6 million in 2016; most of which are from post-Soviet states, mainly Ukrainians. There are 22 republics in Russia, who have their own ethnicities, cultures, and languages. In 12 of them in 2021, ethnic Russians constitute a minority:

Languages
 

Russian is the official and the predominantly spoken language in Russia. It is the most spoken native language in Europe, the most geographically widespread language of Eurasia, as well as the world's most widely spoken Slavic language. Russian is the second-most used language on the Internet after English, and is one of two official languages aboard the International Space Station, as well as one of the six official languages of the United Nations.

Russia is a multilingual nation; approximately 100–150 minority languages are spoken across the country. According to the Russian Census of 2002, 142.6 million across the country spoke Russian, 5.3 million spoke Tatar, and 1.8 million spoke Ukrainian. The constitution allows the country's individual republics the right to establish their own state languages in addition to Russian, as well as guarantee its citizens the right to preserve their native language and to create conditions for its study and development. However, various experts have claimed Russia's linguistic diversity is rapidly declining.

Religion

Russia is a secular state by constitution, and its largest religion is Christianity. It has the world's largest Orthodox population. As of a different sociological surveys on religious adherence; between 41% to over 80% of the total population of Russia adhere to the Russian Orthodox Church. Other branches of Christianity present in Russia include Catholicism (approx. 1%), Baptists, Pentecostals, Lutherans and other Protestant churches (together totalling about 0.5% of the population) and Old Believers. There is some presence of Judaism, Buddhism, and Hinduism; pagan beliefs are also present to some extent in remote areas, sometimes syncretized with one of the mainstream religions.

In 2017, a survey made by the Pew Research Center showed that 73% of Russians declared themselves as Christians—out of which 71% were Orthodox, 1% were Catholic, and 2% were Other Christians, while 15% were unaffiliated, 10% were Muslims, and 1% followed other religions. According to various reports, the proportion of Atheists in Russia is between 16% and 48% of the population.

Islam is the second-largest religion in Russia, and it is the traditional religion amongst most peoples of the North Caucasus, and amongst some Turkic peoples scattered along the Volga-Ural region. Buddhists have a sizable population in three Siberian republics: Buryatia, Tuva, and Zabaykalsky Krai, and in Kalmykia, the only region in Europe where Buddhism is the most practised religion.

Education

Russia has an adult literacy rate of 100%. It grants free education to its citizens under its constitution. The Ministry of Education of Russia is responsible for primary and secondary education, as well as vocational education; while the Ministry of Education and Science of Russia is responsible for science and higher education. Regional authorities regulate education within their jurisdictions within the prevailing framework of federal laws. Russia is among the world's most educated countries, and has the third-highest proportion of tertiary-level graduates in terms of percentage of population, at 62%. It spent roughly 4.7% of its GDP on education in 2018.

Russia has compulsory education for a duration of 11 years, exclusively for children aged 7 to 17–18. Its pre-school education system is highly developed and optional, some four-fifths of children aged 3 to 6 attend day nurseries or kindergartens. Primary school is compulsory for 11 year-olds, starting from age 6 to 7, and leads to a basic general education certificate. An additional two or three years of schooling are required for the secondary-level certificate, and some seven-eighths of Russians continue their education past this level. Admission to an institute of higher education is selective and highly competitive: first-degree courses usually take five years. The oldest and largest universities in Russia are Moscow State University and Saint Petersburg State University. There are ten highly prestigious federal universities across the country. Russia was the world's fifth-leading destination for international students in 2019, hosting roughly 300,000.

Urbanized areas

Russia is one of the world's most urbanized countries, with roughly 75% of its total population living in urban areas. Moscow, the capital and largest city, has a population estimated at 12.4 million residents within the city limits, while over 17 million residents in the urban area, and over 20 million residents in the metropolitan area. Moscow is among the world's largest cities, being the most populous city entirely within Europe, the most populous urban area in Europe, the most populous metropolitan area in Europe, and also the largest city by land area on the European continent. Saint Petersburg, the cultural capital, is the second-largest city, with a population of roughly 5.4 million inhabitants. Other major urban areas are Yekaterinburg, Novosibirsk, Kazan, Nizhny Novgorod, and Chelyabinsk.

See also
 Demographic history of Russia
 Demographics of Siberia
 Demographic crisis of Russia
 List of federal subjects of Russia by total fertility rate
 List of federal subjects of Russia by life expectancy
 Genetic studies on Russians
 Health in Russia
 Indigenous small-numbered peoples of the North, Siberia and the Far East
 Russian cross
 Russian nationality law

Census information:
 Soviet Census
 Russian Empire Census (1897)
 Russian Census (2002)
 Russian Census (2010)
 Russian Census (2021)
 List of cities and towns in Russia by population

Notes

References

Further reading
 Gavrilova N.S., Gavrilov L.A. Aging Populations: Russia/Eastern Europe. In: P. Uhlenberg (Editor), International Handbook of the Demography of Aging, New York: Springer-Verlag, 2009, pp. 113–131.
 Gavrilova N.S., Semyonova V.G., Dubrovina E., Evdokushkina G.N., Ivanova A.E., Gavrilov L.A. Russian Mortality Crisis and the Quality of Vital Statistics. Population Research and Policy Review, 2008, 27: 551–574.
 Gavrilova, N.S., Gavrilov, L.A., Semyonova, V.G., Evdokushkina, G.N., Ivanova, A.E. 2005. Patterns of violent crime in Russia. In: Pridemore, W.A. (ed.). Ruling Russia: Law, Crime, and Justice in a Changing Society. Boulder, Colorado: Rowman & Littlefield Publ., Inc, 117–145
 Gavrilova, N.S., Semyonova, V.G., Evdokushkina G.N., Gavrilov, L.A. The response of violent mortality to economic crisis in Russia. Population Research and Policy Review, 2000, 19: 397–419.

External links
 Igor Beloborodov, Demographic situation in Russia in 1992–2010 (report at the Moscow Demographic Summit — June 2011)
 Nicholas Eberstadt, Russia's Peacetime Demographic Crisis: Dimensions, Causes, Implications (National Bureau of Asian Research Project Report, May 2010)
 Edited by Julie DaVanzo, Gwen Farnsworth Russia's Demographic "Crisis" 1996 RAND 
 Jessica Griffith The Regional Consequences of Russia's Demographic Crisis  University of Leicester
 Results of population policy and current demographic situation (2008)
 Interactive statistics for all countries, site of United States Census Bureau.
 2009 World Population Data Sheet  by the Population Reference Bureau
 Population density and distribution maps (text is in Russian; the topmost map shows population density based on 1996 data)
 Ethnic groups of Russia
 Problems with mortality data in Russia
 V. Borisov "Demographic situation in Russia and the role of mortality in reproduction of population", 2005 (in English)
 Choice between mass migration and birth rate increase as possible solutions of depopulation problem in Russia (in Russian)

 
Social groups of Russia